KGHS (1230 AM) is a local radio station in International Falls, Minnesota, broadcasting at 1230 with 460 watts. KGHS carries Westwood One's "Good Time Oldies" format, via satellite. It also carries local news and information programming. The station is owned by Jimmy D. Birkemeyer, through licensee R & J Broadcasting. Its one transmitting tower is east of the town. The studios are at 519 Third Street, with sister station KSDM.

KGHS first went on the air in 1959. The music format at that time was a mixture of just about any and everything from country, instrumentals, big bands, etc.

On September 16, 2016, Red Rock Radio announced that it would sell KGHS and KSDM to R & J Broadcasting as part of an eight station deal; the sale was completed on December 21, 2016.

References

External links

FCC History Cards for KGHS

Radio stations in Minnesota
Oldies radio stations in the United States
Radio stations established in 1959
1959 establishments in Minnesota
International Falls, Minnesota